Mimogrynex densepunctatus is a species of beetle in the family Cerambycidae, and the only species in the genus Mimogrynex. It was described by Stephan von Breuning in 1939.

The type locality for M. densepunctatus is Kodaikanal, India, and this species is 11.5 mm long and 4 mm wide.

References

Morimopsini
Beetles described in 1939
Taxa named by Stephan von Breuning (entomologist)